Stephen Michael Harding Oliver (10 March 1950 – 29 April 1992) was an English composer, best known for his operas.

Early life and education
Oliver was born on 10 March 1950 in Chester, the son of (Charlotte Hester) (née Girdlestone, born 1911), a religious education adviser, and Osborne George Oliver (born 1903), an electricity board official.  His maternal great-grandfather was William Boyd Carpenter, a Bishop of Ripon and a court chaplain to Queen Victoria.

Oliver was educated at St Paul's Cathedral School, Ardingly College and at Worcester College, Oxford, where he read music under Kenneth Leighton and Robert Sherlaw Johnson. His first opera, The Duchess of Malfi (1971), was staged while he was still at Oxford.

Career
Later works include incidental music for the Royal Shakespeare Company (including The Life and Adventures of Nicholas Nickleby), a musical, Blondel (1983; with Tim Rice), and over forty operas, including Tom Jones (1975), Beauty and the Beast (1984) and Timon of Athens (1991). Oliver also wrote music for television, including several of the BBC's Shakespeare productions (Timon among those), the soundtrack to the 1986 film Lady Jane, and some chamber and instrumental music.

He was a good friend of Simon Callow who commissioned the piece Ricercare No. 4 for vocal quartet Cantabile.
He also composed the score for the thirteen-hour radio dramatisation of Tolkien's The Lord of the Rings, first broadcast on BBC Radio 4 in 1981. The work  combined a main theme with many  sub-themes, all composed within the English pastoral tradition. 

In Tony Palmer's film Wagner (1982–83), Oliver can be seen playing the part of conductor Hans Richter and conducting in the pit of Richard Wagner's theatre at Bayreuth.

Other activities
Oliver was a frequent guest on BBC Radio 4's light discussion programme Stop The Week.

Death and legacy
He died in London on 29 April 1992, aged 42, of AIDS-related complications. 

In 2006, Oliver's archive of original scores and papers was presented to the British Library by his family.

His nephew is comedian and TV host John Oliver.

Stephen Oliver Trust

Oliver left most of his estate in trust, to further the work he had already been doing during his life, helping to fund small-scale opera companies and young composers of opera. In March 1993 the Stephen Oliver Trust was established, which was enlarged by several large donations and covenants. Trustees include conductor Jane Glover and composer Jonathan Dove. The stated aims of the trust are:
to encourage the creation, promotion and performance of contemporary opera; and
to encourage young people working in contemporary opera.

The trust established the Stephen Oliver Prize, a biennial award of £10,000 launched in 1994, awarded to given to a young composer for a new work of comic opera. Launched in 1994, there were two prizes awarded, with the first awarded to David Horne for Travellers, and the second in 1996 to Tim Benjamin, for The Bridge. The trust worked with other organisations to bring the two composers' operas to the stage in June 1998, as part of the 1998 Covent Garden Festival.

After the competitions, the trust turned its attention to supporting compositions and occasional performances by contemporary opera companies. In 2006, the trustees decided to lodge the capital funds within the Countess of Munster Musical Trust, which administers the Stephen Oliver Award, as well as other funding to young musicians.

References

Further reading

"Friendships in Constant Repair": perspectives on the life and work of Stephen Oliver.

External links 
 Official Stephen Oliver website
 
 Composer page at ChesterNovello.com
 BBC Shakespeare
 The Stephen Oliver Archive at the British Library
 

1950 births
1992 deaths
People educated at Ardingly College
Alumni of Worcester College, Oxford
20th-century classical composers
English classical composers
English agnostics
People from Chester
AIDS-related deaths in England
People educated at St. Paul's Cathedral School
20th-century English composers
English male classical composers
20th-century British male musicians